Pa Daeng is a sub-district in the Chat Trakan District of Phitsanulok Province, Thailand. The literal translation of the name is 'red forest', but the term refers to a forest of trees shedding their leaves.

Geography
Pa Daeng lies in the Nan Basin, which is part of the Chao Phraya Watershed.

Administration
The following is a list of the subdistrict's muban, which roughly correspond to villages:

Temples
The following is a list of active Buddhist temples in Pa Daeng:

Wat Pa Daeng in Ban Pa Daeng
Wat Ban Na in Ban Na
วัดบ้านน้อยโพธิ์ไทรงาม in Ban Thanoo Thong
วัดน้ำภาคน้อย in Ban Nam Pak Noi
วัดป่าห้วยเหิน in Ban Huai Noen
วัดราชสามัคคีธรรม in Ban Na Lom
วัดเวฬุวันประชาสัคค์ in Ban Na Lom
Wat Mai Samakee (Na Lom) in Ban Mai Thai Jayrin

References

Tambon of Phitsanulok province
Populated places in Phitsanulok province